Albert van der Merwe (born 1 June 1979) is a South African-born Irish cricketer.  Van der Merwe is right-handed batsman who bowls right-arm off break and who played international cricket for Ireland.  He was born in Bellville, Cape Province. He was educated at Huguenot High School, Wellington, Cape Province. Van der Merwe captained the North West University (Pukke) (formerly known as Potchefstroomse Universiteit) to their maiden SA University title in 2001. He was also part of the 2001 side that won the South African National Club Championships. Van der Merwe has played cricket for Irish club sides Derriaghy, The Hills and YMCA CC. Van der Merwe announced his retirement from international cricket in 2013.  He is currently head coach of Leinster Lightning, one of 3 interprovincial teams in the Irish Domestic First Class set up.

Van der Merwe made his List-A debut for Ireland against West Indies A during their tour of Ireland, where he played both matches against the tourists.

Van der Merwe was a member of Ireland's 2010 ICC World Cricket League Division One winning squad.  During the tournament, he made his One Day International debut against the Netherlands.

Van der Merwe was selected in Ireland's 15-man squad for the 2011 World Cup, but did not play in the tournament. In January 2012 Cricket Ireland increased the number of player contracts to 23 across three categories, and van der Merwe was given a category C contract.

In April 2019, Cricket Ireland appointed him as the Talent Pathway Manager and Coach of the national team.

References

External links
 

1979 births
Cricketers from Cape Town
Living people
Irish people of South African descent
Irish cricketers
Ireland One Day International cricketers
Cricketers at the 2011 Cricket World Cup
Irish cricket coaches
Leinster Lightning cricketers